Langnes may refer to:

Places

Antarctica
Langnes Fjord, a fjord in Antarctica
Langnes Peninsula, a peninsula in Antarctica

Norway
Langnes, Troms, a village in Lenvik municipality, Troms county, Norway
Langnes, Østfold, a village in Askim municipality, Østfold county, Norway
Langnes Airport in the city of Tromsø, also known as Tromsø Airport
Langnes Station, a railway station located at Langnes in Askim municipality on the Østfold Line

People
Ole Arvid Langnes, a retired Norwegian football goalkeeper

Other
Battle of Langnes, a battle fought between Norway and Sweden as a part of the Swedish-Norwegian War of 1814

See also
Langness
Langenes (disambiguation)
Langeness